Eric Warren Allender (born 1956) is an American computer scientist active in the field of computational complexity theory.

In 2006 he was inducted as a Fellow of the Association for Computing Machinery. He is currently a professor at Rutgers University where he chaired the Department of Computer Science from 2006 until 2009.

Biography
Allender went to Mount Pleasant High School. He graduated from the University of Iowa in 1979 with a double major in Computer Science and Theater. He then graduated from the Georgia Institute of Technology with a Ph.D. in Computer Science in 1985.

After graduation, he was a professor at Rutgers University.

References

External links
 Rutgers home page
 Eric Warren Allender on the Mathematics Genealogy Project

American computer scientists
Theoretical computer scientists
Fellows of the Association for Computing Machinery
Rutgers University faculty
Georgia Tech alumni
Living people
1956 births